Lathraeocarpa is a genus of flowering plants belonging to the family Rubiaceae.

Its native range is Madagascar.

Species:

Lathraeocarpa acicularis 
Lathraeocarpa decaryi

References

Rubiaceae
Rubiaceae genera